The 1998–99 Serie A saw Milan win their 16th Scudetto, led by coach Alberto Zaccheroni. Lazio finished second, losing the title on the last day. Internazionale, with an often injured or rested Ronaldo, had a disastrous season, finishing in 8th position, whereas Juventus' impressive start was cut short by a bad injury to Alessandro Del Piero, and they wound up having an unimpressive season.

Teams
Salernitana, Venezia, Cagliari and Perugia had been promoted from Serie B.

Personnels and Sponsoring

Number of teams by region

League table

Results

UEFA Cup qualification
6th and 7th of Serie A:

Coppa Italia Third place:

Udinese and Bologna qualified to 1999–2000 UEFA Cup, while Juventus qualified for the 1999 UEFA Intertoto Cup.

Top goalscorers

References and sources

Almanacco Illustrato del Calcio – La Storia 1898-2004, Panini Edizioni, Modena, September 2005

External links

 :it:Classifica calcio Serie A italiana 1999 – Italian version with pictures and info.
  – All results on RSSSF Website.
 1998/1999 Serie A Squads – (www.footballsquads.com)

Serie A seasons
Italy
1998–99 in Italian football leagues